Chung Sun-Hye or Jeong Seon-Hye (born 17 December 1975) was a South Korean female volleyball player. 
She was part of the South Korea women's national volleyball team.

She participated in the 1998 FIVB Volleyball Women's World Championship.
She competed with the national team at the 2000 Summer Olympics in Sydney, Australia, finishing 8th.

See also
 South Korea at the 2000 Summer Olympics

References

External links
 
http://www.worldofvolley.com/user/profileClaim.html?profileId=47876&profileUserName=sun-hye.chung&profileFullName=Sun-Hye%20%20Chung&name=Sun-Hye%20%20Chung&backUrl=/wov-community/players/47876/sun-hye-chung.html
http://www.fivb.org/EN/Volleyball/Competitions/GrandChampionCup/Women/2001/Stats/Best_Scorers.asp
https://abcnews.go.com/Sports/story?id=100422
http://theworldlink.com/american-s-survive-volleyball-marathon-to-reach-semifinals/article_403e90b4-94e4-5aa3-8806-ea57a74c92d0.html

1975 births
Living people
South Korean women's volleyball players
Place of birth missing (living people)
Volleyball players at the 1996 Summer Olympics
Volleyball players at the 2000 Summer Olympics
Olympic volleyball players of South Korea
Volleyball players at the 1994 Asian Games
Volleyball players at the 1998 Asian Games
Volleyball players at the 2002 Asian Games
Asian Games medalists in volleyball
Asian Games gold medalists for South Korea
Asian Games silver medalists for South Korea
Medalists at the 1994 Asian Games
Medalists at the 1998 Asian Games
Medalists at the 2002 Asian Games
20th-century South Korean women
21st-century South Korean women